Israel entered the Eurovision Song Contest 1995 with the song "Amen" by Liora after she won the Israeli national final.

Before Eurovision

Kdam Eurovision 1995 
This Israeli broadcaster, IBA, held a national final to select the Israeli entry for the Eurovision Song Contest 1995, held in Dublin, Ireland. The contest was held at the IBA TV Studios in Jerusalem, hosted by Aki Avni and Michaela Berko. 13 songs competed, with the winner being decided through the votes of 7 regional juries. The spokesperson for Haifa's jury, Ofer Nachshon, would later go on to present Israel's votes at Eurovision between 2009 and 2017.

The winner was Liora (Liora Fadlon Simon) with the song "Amen", composed by Hamutal Ben-Ze'ev.

At Eurovision
Liora performed 21st on the night of the final, following Slovenia and preceding Malta. She received 81 points, placing 8th in a field of 23.

Voting

References

External links
 Israeli National Final 1995

1995
Countries in the Eurovision Song Contest 1995
Eurovision